Hrazdan Gorge Aqueduct is an aqueduct bridge across the Hrazdan River in the Armenian capital of Yerevan. It was designed by architect Rafael Israelyan and completed in 1949–1950. It was built with grey-coloured basalt stones. The aqueduct has a length of 100 metres and a width of 5 metres.

References

Bridges in Yerevan
Bridges completed in 1950
Road bridges in Armenia